The Middleby Auto Company (1908-1913) was a brass era American automobile manufacturer, based in Reading, Pennsylvania.

History 
The company was founded by Joseph Middleby, who purchased the Duryea Power Company factory. Some Middlebys were sold as Readings.

Middleby's first 1908 Model A automobile was a runabout with a 108-inch wheelbase and 30 x 3 1/2 inch tires, a four-cylinder, air-cooled engine, with a sliding-gear shaft-drive transmission with three speeds forward and one reverse. Standard equipment included two gas lamps, two side oil lamps, one rear lamp, tools, and a French horn. Its price was $850, .

Model B was a touring car, based on the same chassis, and priced at $1,000. By 1910 the company had sold about 400 automobiles. After 1911, the wheel base increased to 120 inches, with 36-inch wheels and a 4-cylinder water-cooled engine.  Middleby automobiles were produced in six models: a Runabout for $850, single rumble for $1,000, surrey for $1,000, double rumble for $1,100, touring car for $1,200, and Toy Tonneau for $1,200, .

Two automobile reference books show Charles M. Middleby as company owner. His relationship to the plant property owner, Joseph Middleby, is not known.  Joseph Middleby died in 1911, and the company was operated by his executors until closed and sold in 1913.

Middleby Advertisements

Reading 
Between 1910 and 1913,an up-market Middleby was market as the Reading.  It had a larger four-cylinder engine, was a foot longer in wheelbase, and was priced several hundred dollars more.  Charles M. Middleby decided that his top-of-the-line car should carry his own name, a bigger and pricier Middleby was introduced for 1911. Both marques ended in 1913.

References 

Defunct motor vehicle manufacturers of the United States
American companies established in 1908
Vehicle manufacturing companies established in 1908
1908 establishments in Pennsylvania
American companies disestablished in 1913
Vehicle manufacturing companies disestablished in 1913
1913 disestablishments in Pennsylvania
Companies based in Reading, Pennsylvania
Brass Era vehicles
1900s cars
1910s cars
Motor vehicle manufacturers based in Pennsylvania
Cars introduced in 1908